Michael Yonting (born January 5, 1970), more popularly known by his screen name Mitoy Yonting, is a Filipino singer, comedian, actor, and lead vocalist for his band, The Draybers. Yonting rose to fame after winning the first season of The Voice of the Philippines in 2013.

Background
Yonting was born on January 5, 1970, and was raised in Calasiao, Pangasinan Province. His passion for music started at the early age of 13, when he often listened to radio and made his own singing routines. During high school, he began joining several local competitions. During college, he took up Criminology at the Philippine College of Criminology. During this time, his singing career took off where he joined a band. He eventually gave up his education to focus in his singing career.

Personal life
He is married to a non-showbiz wife, Merlita Runas.

Career

Beginnings
He was discovered after competing in the 1990s televised singing competition "Ikaw at Echo", a segment of the noontime variety show Eat Bulaga! on GMA Network where he competed as a voice-a-like of Air Supply's Russell Hitchcock. Though he did not win the title, he gained popularity. In 1996, he and his brother, Mylo Yonting, formed a band called 'The Draybers' and joined Rockstar: Bakit?, a sing-alike television show.

Through his television appearances, Yonting pursued a career as a comedian in GMA Network's sitcom called the Ful Haus, and the comedy sketch show  aired on QTV (now GMA News TV). He later on became a regular host in Eat Bulaga!. This stint, however, was short-lived and then decided to reunite with his band.

Later on his band toured several countries including Japan where he met his wife, to play for various Filipino communities. By late 2011, the band came back to Manila and performed in Resorts World Manila.

The Voice of the Philippines

In 2013, Mitoy was invited to join the first season of The Voice of the Philippines. During the blind auditions, he sang "Bakit Ako Mahihiya" of Didith Reyes. His audition piece made Bamboo Mañalac and Lea Salonga, who got excited after hearing his voice, turn their chairs for him. After he finished his audition piece, Salonga requested that he sing a non-English song, and he responded by singing a Japanese song. Yonting then picked Salonga as his coach. During the Battles, he was paired with Chien Berbana and performed "Alone" of the American rock band Heart, a performance which was widely commended by both the judges and the show's followers. At the end of the round, Salonga picked Yonting citing his experience and prowess.

During the Live shows, Yonting continued to make waves in the competition. During his first appearance in the Live Shows, he performed "Don't Stop Me Now" of the English rock band Queen. During that particular episode, he was saved after garnering 82.29% of the public's vote. During the third Live show, Yonting performed Dulce's "Paano" against Darryl Shy who sang Asin's Balita. Yonting lost to Shy for the public's vote but won after he got the highest points of the accumulated coach's and public's scores. In the first night of the semi-finals, he was paired up against Radha where both performed "Against All Odds" of Phil Collins as an à la battle song. In the second night, he performed "The Power of Love" by Jennifer Rush. At the end of the show, Yonting was proclaimed as the Salonga's representative to the Finals. After the results, he performed his original song, "Bulag."

During the first night of the finals, he performed Freddie Aguilar's "Anak" and his original song "Bulag." At the second night of the finals, Yonting made a trio performance with Salonga and Vice Ganda where they performed "Total Eclipse of the Heart" by Bonnie Tyler. After the end of the round of votes, Yonting along with Sarah Geronimo's Klarisse de Guzman made it to the top two. In his last performance, he sang The Beatles' "Help!". At the end of the voting, Yonting received 57.65% of the votes proclaiming him the winner of the reality competition. With his title, he also won two million pesos, a brand new car, and a four-year contract with MCA Music.

Post The Voice of the Philippines
After winning The Voice of the Philippines, Yonting became part of the Philippine Ballet Theatre's two night concert called Sayaw at Serye on November 15 and 16, 2013. Yonting was one of the cast of Home Sweetie Home, ABS-CBN's newest sitcom, which premiered in January 2014. He was also a supporting act for Lea Salonga's concert series titled 'Playlist', which ran from December 2013 to January 2014. Yonting and Salonga performed a medley together during the concert.

Acting

Mitoy is also part of a sitcom, "Home Sweetie Home" from 2018 to 2020.  Recently in 2021, Mitoy is formerly a cast guest member part of an action series and also his very 1st drama teleserye in a longest running action drama teleserye series, "FPJ's Ang Probinsyano", with his co-stars Coco Martin, John Prats, Tirso Cruz III, Jane De Leon, Ara Mina, Basillyo, CJ Ramos,, and real life father and sons of Michael De Mesa & Geoff Eigenmann.  This 2022, Mitoy returns to action drama series and also his 2nd action drama teleserye, The Iron Heart with his co stars former child star & Former Ang Probinsyano villain now a lead good boy role Richard Gutierrez, also featuring Sue Ramirez, Albert Martinez, Pepe Herrera, Jake Cuenca, Roi Vinzon, Mitoy Yonting, Manuel Chua, Kyle Echarri, Karina Bautista, and special participation of Maja Salvador.

Discography

Albums
 The Voice of the Philippines – The Final 16 (MCA Music, 2013)
 The Voice of the Philippines – The Final 4 (MCA Music, 2013)
 The Voice of the Philippines: The Complete Season 1 Collection (MCA Music, 2013)
 Hanggang Wakas (Until Forever) (2014)

Singles
 "Bulag" (2013)
 "Pinaikot-Ikot" (2014)

Filmography

Film

Television

Concert tours
Supporting act
 Playlist: A Celebration of 35 Years (2013–2014) (supporting Lea Salonga)

Awards and recognitions
 Best Male Performer in Hotels, Music Lounges, Bars (26th Aliw Awards, 2013)

References

External links
 Mitoy Yonting on Twitter

1970 births
Living people
21st-century Filipino male singers
Filipino male comedians
Filipino male television actors
Singers from Pangasinan
People from Sampaloc, Manila
Singers from Manila
Tenors
GMA Network personalities
Participants in Philippine reality television series
The Voice (franchise) winners
The Voice of the Philippines contestants
ABS-CBN personalities
Star Magic
MCA Music Inc. (Philippines) artists
20th-century Filipino male singers